Cape Markov is an ice cape on the east side of Amundsen Bay, situated  west of Mount Riiser-Larsen in Enderby Land, Antarctica. It was named by the Soviet Antarctic Expedition, 1961–62, for K.K. Markov, professor of geography at Moscow State University, and the author of a number of reports on Antarctica.

References

Headlands of Enderby Land